Joan Munar Martínez (born 1 February 1996 in Palma de Mallorca, Balearic Islands) is a Paralympic athlete from Spain competing mainly in category T12 track and field events. He has a vision impairment.

Personal 
Munar was born on 1 February 1996 in Palma de Mallorca, Balearic Islands, Spain. He has a vision impairment.  He lived in the Baleric Islands.

Athletics 
Munar is a Paralympic T12 track and field athlete.  He does not race with a sighted guide.

Munar has won the Mallorca Athletics Region Championship.  In 2011, he won the Spanish national championship. He competed at the 2012 IPC European Athletics Championships and earned two golds in the 100 meter and 200 meter events.  One of his golds came in the 200 meters. He competed in the 2012 Summer Paralympics in London, England where he finished 12th in the 100 meters and had a DNF in the 4 X 100 meter race. The 100 meters was his first race of the Games.  He ran in the semi-finals with his guide in the 4x100 meter race on the seventh day of the Games.  He was one of twenty-four members of the Spanish athletics team.  Competing at the Games as a 16-year-old, he was the youngest member of the athletics team. In May 2013, he competed in the Spanish national championships, where he earned a gold medal in the 200 meters and a silver in the 100 meters. In July 2013, he participated in the 2013 IPC Athletics World Championships.

References

External links 
 Joan Munar Martínez on Twitter

Paralympic athletes of Spain
Athletes (track and field) at the 2012 Summer Paralympics
Athletes (track and field) at the 2016 Summer Paralympics
Living people
1996 births
Spanish disability athletes
Medalists at the World Para Athletics Championships
Medalists at the World Para Athletics European Championships
Visually impaired sprinters
Paralympic sprinters